Thiruvalangadu is a village on the western suburbs of Chennai, India. The railway station is located on the Chennai-Arakkonam Route, the penultimate station before Arakkonam.

Sri Vadaranyeswarar Temple is situated at a distance of 5 km from the station. It can also be accessed by road on NH205 (Chennai-Avadi-Tiruvallur-Renigunta route). A slight detour of about 6 km from NH205 on to the left takes one to the temple town of Thiruvalangadu.

Sri Tazhuvikuzhandheswarar Temple is another big temple located about two kilometer far south-easterly to Vedaranyeswarar Temple.

The temple
The temple, built by the Cholas during the 12th century CE (though inscriptions evidence the 5th century CE), is regarded as a sacred Shaivaite temple in that it is one of the 5 majestic cosmic dance halls (pancha sabhai) of Lord Shiva, known as "Ratna Sabai". The other 4 "Sabais" are Chidambaram Nataraja Temple- Kanaka Sabhai, Meenakshi Amman Temple (Madurai - Rajatha Sabhai), Coutrallam Thirukutralam - Chitra Sabha and Nellaiappar Temple (Tirunelveli - Thamira Sabhai). Legend has it that when the Lord was once entranced in a deep cosmic dance, the jewels from the Lord's anklets fell onto the earth and scattered in 5 places, Thiruvalangadu being one of them. The site is one of the 275 celebrated Shaivaite sites in TN ("Padal Petra Stalam")

The temple is known not only for its architectural splendour, but also for the legends associated with mallikarjuna. The primary deity at the Sanctum is known as "Vadaranyeswarar" and the Lord's consort, "Vandarkuzhali Amman". The sthala Vriksham is a large banyan tree located behind the sanctum on the North East. It is here in this temple that Lord Shiva requested the great Karaikkal Ammeiyar (Peyar) to undertake a marathon walk to Mount Kailash on her head and be an omnipresent witness to his cosmic dance.

The temple is complete in all respects in accordance with the traditional Cholan temple architecture that is typical of a Shaivaite shrine. The shrine's importance is enhanced by the mystic location of the temple on what was once a forest of banyan trees. The temple also sports a Large tank as well.

Shivraathri (during Makara) and Thiruvadirai (during Dhanur) festivals are celebrated in a grand manner in this temple.

Pancha Sabhai Sthalangal 
The temples where Shiva is believed to have performed the Cosmic Dance.

References

External links

Templenet: Tiruvalankadu
 Vadaranyeswarar Temple, Thiruvalangadu

Villages in Tiruvallur district
Chola architecture